Parthenin is a chemical compound classified as a sesquiterpene lactone.  It has been isolated from Parthenium hysterophorus.

It is genotoxic, allergenic, and an irritant.  Parthenin is believed to be responsible for the dermatitis caused by Parthenium hysterophorus.

References

sesquiterpene lactones
Vinylidene compounds